Multiverse Music is a British music publisher directed by James Ginzburg that was founded in 2004 to showcase the work of contemporary  electronic artists involved with and operating from their Bristol based studio.

Currently Multiverse's output revolves around work produced by Paul Jebanasam, Roly Porter and Emptyset. Projects have included scores for feature films such as Roly Porter's original score for "In Fear", installations such as emptyset's Tate Britain commissioned "Trawsfynydd", and the modern classical output of the Multiverse record label "Subtext" such as Paul Jebanasam's 2013 LP "Rites".

From 2004-2008, Multiverse was responsible for seminal releases from artists such as Pinch, 2562, Vex'd, Skream, Emptyset,  Joker and Pinch's Tectonic (one of the first Dubstep labels) is now recognised as having played a significant role in the genres worldwide growth and success.

In 2009 the company acquired a new studio space in Clifton, Bristol's film and media district to serve as the main production facility for the various audio-visual and recording projects of their artists. In September 2017 Youth & Power released on Other/other, a new label that falls under the umbrella of Multiverse Music.

Active Labels
 Arc Light Editions
 Subtext

Historic Labels
Tectonic
 World of Wonders
 Earwax
 Caravan
 Kapsize
 Build
 State of Joy
 Vertical Sound

Notable published works
 Paul Jebanasam – Transformer's 3 Theatrical Trailer 
 Roly Porter - OST: In Fear
 Pinch - Underwater Dancehall
 2562 - Ariel / Unbalance
 Paul Jebanasam & James Fiddian – Falling Skies TV Trailer
 emptyset – demiurge
 Scientist / Various Artists – Scientist Launches Dubstep into Outer Space
 Joker – Tron
 Roly Porter – Aftertime
 James Fiddian – Cravendale "Cats with Thumbs" Ad Score

Non-Exhaustive List of Syncs and Usages
2015

 The Martian, Movie Trailer - Roly Porter -  “Black Flag “
 Spooks: The Greater Good, Movie Trailer - Paul Jebanasam & James Fiddian –“Tarpan”
 Hitman: Agent 47 (multiverse sound design) - Multiverse – “Debris Shudder”
 Fantastic 4, Movie Trailer - Roly Porter – “Black Flag”
 Women in Black 2  (multiverse sound design) – Multiverse – “V FX Death Valves”
 Intersteller - (multiverse sound design) – Mutliverse – “MV Loops IO transition”
 Hobbits (animal TV show) – Multiverse -  “bowed corridor and bowed tank”
 Jurassic World  (multiverse sound design) – Multiverse – “Piano Scrapes”
 Nike/acronym - emptyset "Trawsfynydd Nuclear Power Station and Gate 4”
 Charles Atlas, Channel 4 television in the UK as part of the experimental shorts series Random Acts - Eric Holm - "Andoya"

2014

 Mohammed, Movie Trailer - James Fiddian  “Sarajevo” & “Curiocity”
 Alpha Papa, Movie Trailer - James Fiddian  - “Monolith”
 Lucy - (multiverse sound design)  - “MV Atmos Flux / Alien Exhale”
 Boardwalk Empire - US Television Advertisement - P. Jebanasam – “Prelude”
 Intelligence - P. Jebanasam – “Prelude”
 Captain Phillips – Movie Trailer - emptyset – “Trawsfynned”
 TNT Branding  - Roly Porter – “Armour”
 Pompei - (multiverse sound design)  - “EMV Atmos Alien Theramin”
 Acronym - emptyset “Plane”

2013

 Call of Duty – Ghosts - Video Game trailer - J. Ginzburg – “Wither Without”
 Oblivion - Paul Jebanasam - “Ion Source”
 Mercury Music Prize - Ginz & Joker "Purple City"
 Big Talk/Film 4’s - In Fear - Feature Film - Roly Porter - Original Feature Film Score
 Interferenz (Lukas Fiegelfield) - Roly Porter Original Feature Film Score

2012
 Nurofen - Bogiestomp - 'Pull Your family Through'
 "Apples to apples : Glamorous Bigfoot” Mattel - Anton Maiovvi
 Lemsip 'Movie Set' - James Fiddian "Pacific"
 Lemsip Advertisement - James Fiddian “Little Snowflake"
 Adidas Advertisement - 30 Hz - “Innocent"
 Hyundai - Paul Jebanasam “Light"

2011

 Dior, L.Ady Advert film - Sam Simpson Ed Bayling and Sam Simpson, 'Montpelier'
 Cravendale Cats with Thumbs - Paul Jebanasam & James Fiddian
 CSI - Distance “Menace"
 CSI - Ginz & Joker "Purple City" 
 Falling Skies - TV trailer, TNT  - p. jebanasam “prelude"
 Original Score "Northern Bank, Re-Brand"

2010

 Northern Bank TVC (2010) - James Fiddian & Paul Jebanasam (Composition)
 MTV Slips - Liam Mclean (Joker) "Do It"
 MTV Slips - Simon Shreeve & Brett Bigden (Kryptic Minds) "768"

2009

 BBC Masterchef Series Finale - James Ginzburg "In Your Ear"
 Sony PlayStation Game Motorstorm 3 - James Ginzburg & Sam Simpson (The
 Bodysnatchers) "Club Beat Internationale"
 Lexus RX350 TVC - Paul Jebanasam & James Ginzburg "Anton's Journey" - https://www.youtube.com/watch?v=p33UOAMulNE
 Sky TV Ashes Cricket TVC - Paul Jebanasam & James Ginzburg "Anton's Journey" (Re-use)
 Microsoft Xbox Crackdown 2 - Liam Mclean & James Ginzburg (Joker & Ginz) "Purple City"
 Microsoft Xbox Crackdown 2 - Liam Mclean Joker) "Psychedelic Runway"

2008

 Channel 5 Californication (Series 2) Ad Campaign - James Ginzburg & Sam Simpson (The Bodysnatchers) "Freaky Ho"
 Sony PlayStation Motorstorm 2 - James Ginzburg & Sam Simpson (The Bodysnatchers) "Twist Up"
 Met Police Knife Crime TVC - Paul Jebanasam "Uranium"

2007

 Film4 Brick Lane Feature Film - James Ginzburg & James Fiddian (Freakeasy) "I've Been"
 BBC Top Gear - J. Flynn (Cyrus) "Indian Stomp"

2006

 ITV Fat Families TV Series Music & Titles - James Ginzburg & James Fiddian
 Universal Children of Men Feature Film - Rob Ellis & James Ginzburg "War Dub"
 Universal Children of Men Feature Film - J. Flynn (Cyrus) "Indian Stomp"

2005

 Microsoft Xbox Project Gotham City Racing 3 - James Ginzburg "No Man's Land"
 South Georgia Board of Tourism DVD (2005) -  Tangenti Productions, James Ginzburg & James Fiddian (Music Composition)
 Food Standards Agency DVD (2005) - James Fiddian & James Ginzburg (Music Composition)

References

External links
 Multiverse Music Discogs
 Children of Men Soundtrack on IMDB
 Multiverse Music Website

Music publishing companies of the United Kingdom
Publishing companies established in 2004
Companies based in Bristol